John McNeill (1 March 1848 – 12 November 1924) was an Ontario farmer and political figure. He represented Perth South in the Legislative Assembly of Ontario from 1894 to 1898 as a Liberal-Patrons of Industry member.

He was born near Glasgow, Scotland. McNeill served on the council for Fullarton Township. He died there in 1924.

References

External links
The Canadian parliamentary companion, 1897 JA Gemmill

1848 births
1924 deaths
Ontario Patrons of Industry MPPs
Politicians from Glasgow
Scottish emigrants to Canada